Ağcaşar can refer to:

 ; see List of populated places in Kahramanmaraş Province
 Ağcaşar, Köprüköy
 Ağcaşar Dam